William Edward Julian Cayo-Evans (22 April 1937 – 28 March 1995) was a Welsh political activist and one time leader of the radical political group Free Wales Army.

Life
Born at 'Glandenys', Silian, near Lampeter, where he also died, Cayo-Evans was educated at the independent, co-educational Millfield School in the village of Street in Somerset, England. His father was John Cayo Evans, a professor of mathematics at St David's College, Lampeter and High Sheriff of Cardiganshire in the period 1941–42. In 1955, he was conscripted for National Service, serving with the South Wales Borderers and saw active service, fighting Communist guerrillas in Malaya during the bitter Malayan emergency. On his return, he attended the Royal Agricultural College in Cirencester, and after a period as colonial administrator in British India returned to Lampeter to breed palomino and appaloosa horses on his stud farm.

He married Gillianne Mary Davies in 1965. They had three children and divorced in 1975.

Political activism
Best known as a leader of the Free Wales Army, Cayo-Evans appears to have become inspired during the early 1960s, especially during the building of the Tryweryn reservoir. He was 'active' in the FWA during the 1960s and along with two other members of the FWA, Dennis Coslett and Gethyn Ap Iestyn (aka Gethin ap Gruffydd), was convicted of conspiracy to cause explosions and other public order offences following a 53-day trial in 1969. He was sentenced to fifteen months imprisonment, though some sources suggest thirteen months.

Security services' files from the UK National Archives described Cayo-Evans having "a mental age of 12", and Coslett, his second-in-command, as "unbalanced". The documents said that authorities did not regard the Free Wales Army as a serious threat at the time.

Print and performance 
In April 2002 Sgript Cymru produced a play by Dic Edwards based on Julian Cayo-Evans. “Franco's Bastard” at Chapter in Cardiff aroused both interest and protest.

Wyn Thomas published a history of the Free Wales Army "Hands Off Wales" in 2013.

In popular culture 
In 2000, the brewery Tomos Watkin renamed the Apollo Hotel, Cardiff to "The Cayo Arms".

In March 2008, Anhrefn Records released (on Anrhefn 018) a recording of Cayo-Evans playing his accordion and talking between songs, mainly introducing them. The album is titled Marching songs of the Free Wales Army.

References

External links
 Julian Cayo-Evans at The Dictionary of Welsh Biography (published 2016)

1937 births
1995 deaths
People from Ceredigion
People educated at Millfield
Welsh rebels
Welsh republicans
Welsh nationalists
Welsh activists
Alumni of the Royal Agricultural University
South Wales Borderers soldiers
British Army personnel of the Malayan Emergency
Welsh prisoners and detainees
Prisoners and detainees of England and Wales
Welsh-speaking politicians